Franco Daryl Tongya Heubang (born 13 March 2002) is an Italian professional footballer who plays as a midfielder for Danish Superliga club OB.

Club career

Early career
Born in Turin, Italy, to Cameroonian parents, Tongya began his youth career at Brandizzo when he was about four years old, before moving to Juventus' youth sector in 2009 aged seven. In 2016–17 he captained the under-15 side, helping them win the league title.

Tongya made his Serie C debut for Juventus U23 – the reserve team of Juventus – on 28 September 2020, in a 2–1 win over Pro Sesto. He played 10 league games in the first half of the 2020–21 season.

Marseille
On 28 January 2021, Tongya joined Ligue 1 Marseille in a deal worth €8 million, with Marley Aké moving to Juventus for the same fee. He made his debut for the reserve team in the Championnat National 2 on 27 February, as a starter in a 0–0 draw against Rumilly-Vallières.

Odense Boldklub
On 30 August 2022, Tongya joined Danish side OB on a permanent deal, signing a three-year contract with the club. He subsequently made his debut in the Danish Superliga on 4 September, starting the match against Viborg, which ended in a 2-1 defeat for his team.

On 21 October, Tongya scored his first goal with the club, as well as his first professional goal, in a 3–1 league win against Lyngby.

International career 
Tongya has represented Italy internationally from under-16 to under-19 levels. He played for the under-17 side at the 2019 UEFA European Under-17 Championship, playing five games and scoring Italy's winning goal in the semi-finals against Portugal; Italy eventually lost the final to the Netherlands.

Tongya also took part at the 2019 FIFA U-17 World Cup in Brazil; he played as a starter in all five games and scored a goal in the group stage against the Solomon Islands. Italy were knocked out by hosts Brazil in the quarter-finals.

Both in May and December 2022, he was involved in training camps led by the Italian senior national team's manager, Roberto Mancini, and aimed to the most promising national talents.

Style of play 
Mainly a half-winger, Tongya is also capable of playing as an attacking midfielder, or as a winger. He initially started out as a forward, before moving to the midfield. Tongya is a dynamic player, with a good tactical intelligence and technical ability.

Personal life 
Tongya cited Portuguese footballer Cristiano Ronaldo as a point of reference in 2020.

Career statistics

Club

Honours 
Juventus
 : 2016–17

Italy U17
 UEFA European Under-17 Championship runners-up: 2019

References

External links 
 
 
 

2002 births
Living people
Footballers from Turin
Italian footballers
Italian people of Cameroonian descent
Italian sportspeople of African descent
Association football midfielders
Juventus Next Gen players
Juventus F.C. players
Olympique de Marseille players
Serie C players
Championnat National 2 players
Danish Superliga players
Italy youth international footballers
Italian expatriate footballers
Italian expatriate sportspeople in France
Italian expatriate sportspeople in Denmark
Expatriate footballers in France
Expatriate men's footballers in Denmark